Virginia James Tufte (August 19, 1918 – March 28, 2020) was a writer and distinguished emerita professor of English at the University of Southern California. Her special fields were Milton, Renaissance poetry, and the history and grammar of English.

Early life and education 
Virginia James was born in Meadow Grove, Nebraska, one of the ten children of Micah Dickerson James and Sarah Elizabeth Bartee James. Both of her parents were from Virginia. She attended Midland College and worked as a reporter at the Omaha World-Herald and the Nebraska State Journal as a young woman.

After marriage, Tufte pursued further education, earning a bachelor's degree from the University of Nebraska in 1944, a master's degree from Arizona State University, and master's and doctoral degrees in English literature from the University of California, Los Angeles. Her 1964 dissertation was titled "Literary Backgrounds and Motifs of the Epithalamium in English to 1650".

Career 
Tufte was a member of the English faculty of the University of Southern California for 25 years, beginning in 1964, and retiring in 1989. At USC, she won teaching awards and was a co-founder of several interdisciplinary programs. She was perhaps best known for Grammar as Style (1971), which developed a new following several decades after it had gone out of print, prompting her to write its successor, Artful Sentences: Syntax as Style (2006).

Besides her work on syntax and style, Tufte was notable for books and essays in two other areas of literary study and for a video biography. Her book The Poetry of Marriage: The Epithalamium in Europe and its Development in England (1970), a comprehensive history of the English epithalamium, grew from her doctoral research. She also made studies of artists as interpreters of John Milton's poems. Besides numerous essays and contributions to books in this field, some in collaboration with Wendy Furman-Adams of Whittier College, she wrote and produced a one-hour video biography of a literary illustrator Reaching for Paradise: The Life and Art of Carlotta Petrina (1994) that has appeared on educational television stations, is archived in college and university libraries, and is in use in classrooms.

Tufte's interest in life and family histories is reflected also in two collaborative books with anthropologist Barbara Myerhoff, Changing Images of the Family (1981) and Remembered Lives: The Work of Ritual, Storytelling and Growing Older (1992).

Personal life 
Virginia James married Edward E. Tufte  in Omaha in 1940; her husband was city engineer and public works director of the city of Beverly Hills, California, for many years. Their son is Edward Rolf Tufte, an expert in the field of information design, and active as a sculptor. Virginia James Tufte was widowed when her husband died in 1999; she died in 2020, aged 101 years, at her home in Beverly Hills.

Bibliography

References

Writers from Nebraska
University of Southern California faculty
University of California, Los Angeles alumni
University of Nebraska alumni
Arizona State University alumni
Linguists of English
American academics of English literature
1918 births
2020 deaths
American centenarians
Women centenarians